Matthew J. Parlow is the Dean of Chapman University School of Law.

Early life and education
Parlow grew up in Southern California. Parlow earned his bachelor's degree at Loyola Marymount University and his Juris Doctor at Yale Law School.

Career
Parlow became the Dean of Chapman University School of Law on July 1, 2016. Parlow was previously the Associate Dean of Marquette University Law School. While at Marquette, Parlow co-taught a course with former MLB Commissioner Bud Selig.

Personal life 
Parlow married Janine Kim, who teaches at Chapman University School of Law. Parlow was on the board of Bradley Center until June 2016, when he resigned to take his position at Chapman.

References 

Year of birth missing (living people)
Living people
Loyola Marymount University alumni
Yale Law School alumni
Chapman University School of Law faculty
Marquette University faculty
Deans of law schools in the United States